
Karin Kloosterman is a serial entrepreneur, biologist, journalist, environmental publisher, founder of Green Prophet, co-founder of Flux IoT, social entrepreneur and futurist.

Biography
Kloosterman was born in Canada to Dutch and Scottish immigrants.

She studied zoology at the University of Toronto.

Kloosterman first worked at CABI finding natural alternatives to conventional pesticides. During that time and before she had published several papers on tracking forest health using indicator species such as amphibians and the importance of Old Growth Forests for forest health. She left Science because she said it didn't leave space for intuition and even though research institutions welcomed women the entire approach of Biology was masculine and based on antiquated constructs that didn't leave room for intuition.  She travelled to the Middle East and established the blog Green Prophet with the goal of creating a news site where North American Jews could find out about environmental issues which affected Israel. She then decided she didn't need to limit it to just Israel, and begun covering environmental issues throughout the Middle East.

Kloosterman is co-founder of the Internet of things company Flux IoT, based in New York City. She also founded Israel's first and now largest international cannabis technologies conference, CannaTech (although she is no longer involved in the organization), and founded Mars Farm Odyssey to create non-NASA approved solutions for farming in outer space.

Flux IoT, developing a grow robot called Eddy, was hailed by Bloomberg News in 2017 as "likely to disrupt" the food system. In 2017, her alliance Mars Farm was featured in Fast Company. In 2019, Kloosterman was interviewed about her plan for a device that will grow cannabis on Mars.

She has written articles for publications such as Canada's National Post, The Jerusalem Post, HuffPost, TreeHugger, and Pittsburgh Jewish Chronicle.

Personal life 
She has lived in Jaffa, Israel, and is a convert to Judaism. She is married to Israeli musician Yisrael Borochov and has two children.

See also 
 Space farming

References

External links 
 Flux IoT
 Green Prophet

Canadian Jews
Living people
Environmental bloggers
Canadian expatriates in Israel
Canadian people of Dutch descent
Converts to Judaism
People from Jaffa
Canadian women journalists
Canadian women non-fiction writers
21st-century Canadian women writers
Canadian women bloggers
Canadian bloggers
Year of birth missing (living people)
Canadian women environmentalists